The discography of American recording artist Killer Mike consists of five studio albums, three collaborative albums, five mixtapes and eleven singles (including three singles as a featured artist).

Albums

Studio albums

Collaborative albums

Compilation albums

Mixtapes

Singles

As lead artist

As featured artist

Guest appearances

See also
Run the Jewels discography

References

External links
 

Discographies of American artists
Hip hop discographies